Rudnik is a village in Racibórz County, Silesian Voivodeship, in southern Poland. It is the seat of the gmina (administrative district) called Gmina Rudnik.

The village has a population of 850.

Gallery

References

Villages in Racibórz County